Helmut Ringsdorf (born July 30, 1929) in Gießen, Germany is a German polymer chemist. His work has promoted cross-disciplinary discussions and collaborations in the field of polymer chemistry, biology, physics and medicine.  
Ringsdorf's major research works deal with the self-assembly of polymers into functional aggregates, where 'the whole is more than the sum of its parts'.  He is known for being the first to propose covalently bonding drugs to water-soluble polymers.

Early life
Ringsdorf was born in Gießen, Hesse, Germany in 1929.

Education
Ringsdorf took undergraduate studies in Chemistry, Politics and Geology at the universities at Frankfurt, Darmstadt and Freiburg.

Postgraduate work
1960, Research Associate, Polytechnic Inst.of Brooklyn, Brooklyn/United States, Polymer Science.

1959, Teaching Assistant, University of Freiburg, Germany, Polymer Chemistry.

1958, Ph. D., University of Freiburg, Chemistry.

1956, M.S. (Diplom), University Freiburg, Research Assistant of 1953 Nobel Prize winner Hermann Staudinger.

1953, B.S. (Vordiplom)  Technical University, Darmstadt.

1951, Universities Frankfurt, Darmstadt, Freiburg, Chemistry, Politics, Geology

Appointments/Affiliations
2001–Present, Adjunct Professor of Pharmacy,        Cardiff University, Cardiff/Wales,  United Kingdom

1995–1999       Courtauld Visiting Professor,   University of California, Los Angeles     United States

1994–2000       Adjunct Professor of Pharmacy,  University of London,       London      United Kingdom

1988–Present    Adjunct Professor of Poly. Sci., Jilin University, Changchun,    People's Republic of China

1973–1975       Dean of Science University of Mainz,    Mainz,  Germany

1971–1994       Professor of Organic Chemistry, University of Mainz,    Mainz,  Germany

1969–1970       Professor of Polymer Science,   University of Marburg,  Marburg,        Germany

1967–1968       Associate Professor     University of Marburg,  Marburg,        Germany

1962–1967       Assistant Professor     University of Marburg,  Marburg, Germany

Honors and awards
2003    Abbé-Lectureship   University of Jena, Jena, Germany

2002    Prize for Technology a. Appl. Science   C.F.-Pastor-Foundation, Aachen/München, Germany

2001    Friendship Award of the P.R.China       Beijing, P.R.China

2000    Honored Member of the Liquid Crystal Society    LC-Society; Shinshu University, Japan

2000    Rohm and Haas Polymer Lecturer  University of California, Berkeley

1999    Doctor Honoris Causa    ETH Zurich

1998    Distinguished Shipley Lecturer  Clarkson University

1997    Eminent Scientist of RIKEN, RIKEN (Institute of Physical and Chemical Research, Tokyo

1997    E. Gordon Young Memorial Lectureship    The Chemical Institute of Canada

1996    Centenary Lectureship Award     Royal Society of Chemistry, UK

1996    A. Cruikshank Lecture Award in Chemical Sciences        Gordon Conferences

1996    Distinguished Professorship     Kyoto University

1996    Pierre Duhem Lectures   University of Bordeaux, France

1996    Otto M. Smith Lecture   Oklahoma State University

1996    Rushmer Lecture University of Washington

1996    Aggarwal Lectures       Cornell University, Ithaca

1995    Doctor Honoris Causa    University of Dublin, Trinity College

1995    Pirkey Lecture  University of Texas

1994    ACS-Award in Polymer Chemistry  American Chemical Society

1994    Rothschild Professor    Curie Institute, Paris

1994    Ziegler-Natta Lectureship       Italian Chemical Society

1994    G.M.J. Schmidt Lecture  Weizmann Institute of Science, Israel

1993    Japanese Polymer Award  Society of Polymer Science, Tokyo

1993    Doctor Honoris Causa    Université Paris, Paris-Sud

1993    Chevalier l'ordre des Palmes Acad.      Palmes Acad., Paris

1993    Miles Lectureship       University of Pittsburgh

1992    G. Smets Chair in Polymer Science       Universities of Leuven

1992    A. von Humboldt Award   Ministere Français de la Recherche

1992    C.B. Purves Lectures    McGill University

1992    Melvin Calvin Lectureship       University of California, Berkeley

1991    German-Dartmouth Distinguished Professorship    Dartmouth College, Hanover

1990    O.K. Rice Lectures      University of North Carolina at Chapel Hill

1990    CMSE- Distinguished Visiting Scholarship        Massachusetts Institute of Technology

1990    IBM-Research Centre Lectureship IBM, San José

1989    IMS-Distinguished Lectureship   University of Connecticut

1988    Chaire Francqui University of Liège

1987    Frontiers in Chemistry Lectureship      Case Western Reserve University

1987    Mobay Lectures/P. Debye Lectureship     Cornell University

1986    Semon Lectureship       University of Kent

1985    H. Staudinger Award for Polym. Sci.     German Chemical Society

1982    R.T. Major Lectureship  University of Connecticut

1981    JSPS-Fellowship for Polymer Science     Jap. Soc. for Promotion of Sci., Tokyo

1980    H.F. Mark Award for Polymer Science     Austrian Chemical Society, Vienna

1969    K. Winnacker Award      Farbwerke Hoechst, Frankfurt

1960    Carl Duisberg Fellowship        Duisberg Foundation, Bonn

Memberships

1999    Russian Academy of Science, Moscow      Foreign Member

1998–   Conseil National de La Science, Ministere de l'Education, de la Rescherche et de la Technologie Member Advisory Board, Paris

1991    Nordrh.-Westf. Academy of Science       Corresponding Member

1990–1993       German Fonds der Chemie Scientific Committee

1989–1994       Committee Scientifique, Paris      Member

1985–1992       Academy of Science, Berlin/DDR  Foreign Member

1979    Academy of Sciences and Literature, Mainz        Member

1978–1984       Member of the World Health Organization's Committee on Fertility Regulation

1976–1989       DAAD (German Academic Exchange Service) Committee for Scientific Exchange

1976–1979       German Fonds der Chemie Scientific Committee

1971–1976       A. von Humboldt Foundation      Member Foundation Committee

Research interests
Field of Expertise & Research Interests:
Polymer Science as a Bridge between Material Science and Life Science.

Molecular Architecture and Functionalization of Polymeric Liquid Crystals:
Synthesis, structure and property of liquid crystalline side group and main chain polymers; variation of the type of mesogens (rods, discs, boards) and variation of phases. Dye containing and photoreactive liquid crystalline polymers for reversible information storage and non linear optic materials. Phase induction and phase variation of liquid crystalline systems via Charge-Transfer-interaction and metal complexation. Photoconductive discotic systems.

Synthesis, Structure and Properties of Functional Supramolecular Systems:
Polymerizable and functional amphiphiles (detergents, lipids), polymeric monolayers and multilayers via the Langmuir-Blodgett technique and via self-assembly on various surfaces. Liposomes, Black Lipid Membranes, mobile supported bilayers, H-bond induced band structures in water, organization and recognition induced functionality. Multicompartment polymer micelles.

Attempts to Mimic Biomembrane Processes:
Synthetic and natural receptors in molecular assemblies; molecular recognition, 2D-crystallization and function of proteins on monolayers and liposomes, e.g. lectins, streptavidin, monoclonal antibodies, phospholipase A2 and acetylcholinesterase, tailoring of bioreactive surfaces; mixed protein multilayers. Protein–DNA-interaction at ligand lipid monolayers.

Polymers as Active Agents in the Medical Field:
Polymer Therapeutics, Polymer radiation prophylactics, polymeric antitumour agents on a molecular and a cellular level.

References

1929 births
Living people
20th-century German chemists
Academics of Cardiff University
University of California, Los Angeles faculty
Academics of the University of London
Academic staff of Jilin University
Academic staff of Johannes Gutenberg University Mainz
Academic staff of the University of Marburg
Foreign Members of the Russian Academy of Sciences
Members of the German Academy of Sciences at Berlin
Technische Universität Darmstadt alumni
21st-century German chemists